Godfather of The Ghetto is a mixtape by rapper Tony Yayo. The mixtape features exclusive tracks from Tony Yayo with appearances by Raheem Devaughn, Ron Browz, Twista, Gucci Mane and his G-Unit mates Lloyd Banks, Kidd Kidd, 50 Cent. It was released for digital download on June 28, 2013 on datpiff.

Track list

2013 mixtape albums
Tony Yayo albums